Lee Kwang-hee, born in 1960, is a South Korean physicist. Since 2007, he has served as the director of the Research Institute for Solar and Sustainable Energy at the Gwangju Institute of Science and Technology (GIST).

Education
1979–1983: B.S. in nuclear engineering, Seoul National University, South Korea
1983–1985: M.S. in physics, KAIST, Seoul, South Korea
1990–1995: Ph.D. in physics, University of California, Santa Barbara

Work
Lee is currently a full professor of the Materials Science & Engineering Department and a vice-director of the Heeger Center for Advanced Materials at the Gwangju Institute of Science and Technology (GIST) in Korea. His major areas of interest include polymer devices such as polymer LEDs, polymer solar cells, and polymer FETs using semiconducting and metallic polymers. He received a BS degree from Seoul National University in 1983, and a MS degree from KAIST in 1985. After this, he worked at the Korea Atomic Energy Research Institute as a Staff Researcher from 1985 to 1990. He moved to the US for his doctorate study in 1990 at the University of California, in Santa Barbara (UCSB) and obtained his Ph.D. in March 1995 under the supervision of one Professor Alan J. Heeger (the Nobel laureate in Chemistry in 2000). After finishing his post-doctoral work at UCSB in 1997, he started his professorship at the Pusan National University in South Korea. In 2007, Lee moved to his current position of a Full Professor at GIST.

Scientific breakthroughs
Established a theoretical model of charge dynamics in conducting polymers called the localization modified Drude model.
Produced truly metallic polymers.
Performed the fabrication of all-solution processable tandem polymer solar cells
Internal quantum efficiencies approaching 100% were obtained in his polymer solar cells.
He realized that the conductivity of conducting polymer films was increased by aligning polymer chains.
Used statically charged self-assembled non-conjugated polyelectrolytes as an interfacial layer for inverted polymer solar cells
Key role of interchain coupling in the metallic state of conducting polymers

References

1960 births
Living people
Seoul National University alumni
South Korean physicists
University of California, Santa Barbara alumni
Academic staff of Gwangju Institute of Science and Technology